The Education Foundation is a cross-sector UK think tank, created in 2011, based in London and focused on education reform, technology & innovation. It was co-founded by Ty Goddard and Ian Fordham and has had its efforts been praised by Prime Minister David Cameron, Rt Hon Michael Gove, former Secretary of State for Education and was described by Tristram Hunt MP, Shadow Secretary of State for Education as being "at the cutting edge of innovation and reform"

The Education Foundation describes itself as the UK's first cross-party, cross-sector education think tank with a passion to help create a more open and connected education system. It says that its mission is to help Britain create a world class education system and achieve this through accelerating positive reform and innovation in schools, colleges, universities and businesses across the UK.

History
The Education Foundation was set up in 2011 by Goddard and Fordham. Before founding the Education Foundation, Goddard worked in the private (including founder and director of the British Council for School Environments; Managing Director of School Works) and political sector (adviser for the Department for Children, Schools and Families on Extended Schools, Chair of Education at Lambeth Council, member of the Labour Party Schools to Work Commission Inquiry). Fordham is a former secondary school teacher, Deputy Director of the British Council for School Environments, Head of Policy for ContinYou along with serving on government committees, work groups and commissions. The two have more than 30 years of education experience between them.

The pair founded the Education Foundation to provide non-partisan education reform advocacy and "inform the debate through a range of research and practical projects." Since its inception, the groups has focused on encouraging education reform across the United Kingdom,

The group has organised numerous policy events, conferences, summits and roundtables covering subjects ranging from technology and teaching, school design and management. These events have featured industry leaders, teachers and international experts, including a discussion on MOOCs and online learning with the founder of edX Dr. Anant Agarwal. The group has also produced a number of reports reviewing the impact of digital learning on schools and colleges and providing recommendations to encourage meaningful reform in the UK. Last year, it released the Facebook Guide for Teachers, based on research at Wellington College and the London Nautical School.

Initiatives
The Education Reform Summit was launched by the Education Foundation in 2014 and co-hosted by the Department for Education & the Secretary of State for Education. The summit brought together leaders from across the political spectrum, including the Mayor of London Boris Johnson, Tristram Hunt MP, Shadow Secretary of State for Education and education ministers and leaders from across the world. The Rt. Hon Michael Gove, former Secretary of State for Education delivered one of the keynotes, saying, "For the next generation to flourish, education systems must equip every child with the knowledge and skills, the qualifications and confidence they need to succeed."

EdTech Incubator is the first UK education technology accelerator programme, co-run by the Education Foundation and Tech City UK. Started in 2013, the programme hosted EdTech clubs for Tech City & leading technology companies and students, schools, colleges, universities and startups in London and across the country. It also hosted its first cohort of edtech startups in 2014.

Notable publications
 Digital Colleges: The Journey Ahead (November 2014)   
 Facebook Guide for Educators (June 2014)  
 Technology and Education: A System View (June 2014)  
 Education Britain (October 2011)

Senior staff
Ty Goddard, Co-Founder
Ian Fordham, Co-Founder

See also
List of UK think tanks

References

External links
Official website
Huffington Post | Gove's Real Legacy: A British Reform Movement
Let's Work Together to Further Our Schools
Facebook Teachers Guide Launched
EdTech Incubator
 

Political and economic think tanks based in the United Kingdom
2011 establishments in the United Kingdom